The 1999 World Series was the championship series of Major League Baseball's (MLB) 1999 season. The 95th edition of the World Series, it was a best-of-seven playoff between the defending American League (AL) and World Series champion New York Yankees and the National League (NL) champion Atlanta Braves in a rematch of the 1996 World Series, in which the Yankees prevailed. The Yankees swept the 1999 Series in four games for their second consecutive title, third in four years, and 25th overall. It was the Yankees' third straight defeat of the Braves franchise in the Fall Classic (having beaten the Milwaukee Braves in the 1958 World Series in addition to their 1996 victory over the Atlanta Braves). Yankees closer Mariano Rivera was named the World Series Most Valuable Player. This was the first World Series to feature both #1 seeds from the AL and NL, a phenomenon that has only occurred twice since, in 2013 and 2020.

The Yankees advanced to the World Series by defeating the Texas Rangers in the AL Division Series, three games to zero, and then the Boston Red Sox in the AL Championship Series, four games to one. The Braves advanced to the series by defeating the Houston Astros in the NL Division Series, three games to one, and then the New York Mets in the NL Championship Series, four games to two. The 1999 Series is remembered for Chad Curtis's walk-off home run in Game 3, which gave the Yankees a 6–5 victory, and Game 2's infamous interview of Pete Rose by Jim Gray on NBC. This was the first World Series since the advent of the three-division era in 1994 to feature both number-one seeds from the AL and NL, which did not occur again until 2013. The next time the Braves would make the World Series would be in 2021.

Background

This featured a rematch of the 1996 World Series. It would also be the last World Series until 2013 in which the two teams with the best regular-season records in their respective leagues would face off. Perhaps most significantly, it was the first World Series ever in which the competing teams had played each other in the regular season. The Braves won two of three games over the Yankees at Yankee Stadium from July 15 to 17.

The 1999 World Series also feted the All-Century Team, featuring the greatest players of the 20th century as voted by both fans and sportswriters. One of the players on the All-Century Team, Yankees legend Joe DiMaggio, had died in March of that year, with the Yankees honoring him by wearing a black #5 on their sleeves.

Summary

Matchups

Game 1

The 1999 series opened with Greg Maddux facing Orlando Hernández in Game 1, becoming the latest a World Series has ever begun (October 23) beating the previous record by 2 days (1995 World Series, October 21). The Braves got on the board first in the series when Chipper Jones launched a home run down the right field line in the fourth inning. That would be the only hit that El Duque would allow through seven innings while striking out ten Atlanta batters. It would also be the only home run by the Braves in the series. Maddux had pitched scoreless three-hit ball through seven before running into major trouble in the eighth, which began when Scott Brosius singled for the third time in the game. Pinch hitter Darryl Strawberry walked and Chuck Knoblauch reached when Braves first baseman Brian Hunter mishandled his sacrifice bunt attempt. Derek Jeter stroked a single into left with the bases loaded driving in a run. With still nobody out and the bases juiced, Atlanta reliever John Rocker gave up a two-run single to Paul O'Neill through the right side making it 3–1 Yankees. Later in the inning, Rocker walked Jim Leyritz with the bases loaded to force home another run. Mariano Rivera picked up the save to wrap up the 4–1 victory.

Game 2

Game 2 featured the presentation of the All-Century team and an explosion of Yankees runs off Atlanta starter Kevin Millwood. In the first inning, Knoblauch, Jeter, and O'Neill opened the game with singles with O'Neill driving in Knoblauch. After a double-play groundout, both Tino Martinez and Scott Brosius drove in a run with singles each to give the Yankees a 3–0 lead in the first. In the third, Bernie Williams and Martinez hit leadoff singles before the former scored on Ricky Ledee's double. Terry Mulholland relieved starter Kevin Millwood and after getting two outs, shortstop Ozzie Guillén's error on David Cone's ground ball allowed Martinez to score. The Yankees added to their lead off of Mulholland on Martinez's groundout that scored Jeter in the fourth, who led off the inning with a double, and Knoblauch's single in the fifth that scored Brosius, who also doubled to lead off the inning. Cone shutout the Braves for seven innings while Ramiro Mendoza pitched a scoreless eighth, but in the ninth inning, allowed a leadoff single to Chipper Jones. After a two-out walk, Jones scored on Greg Myers's single. Jeff Nelson relieved Mendoza and allowed an RBI double to Bret Boone before getting Otis Nixon to ground out to end the game and give the Yankees a 2-0 series lead. This was the last victory of a World Series Game 2 on the road until the Texas Rangers won Game 2 of the 2011 World Series in St. Louis, and the last time the road team won the first two games of the World Series until 2019 when the Washington Nationals accomplished the feat against the Houston Astros.

Golfer Payne Stewart, a good friend of Braves third baseman Chipper Jones, died between Games 2 and 3. Yankees right fielder Paul O'Neill's father died a few hours before Game 4.

Game 3

Game 3 in New York matched up lefties Andy Pettitte and Tom Glavine, who had been scheduled to start Game 1 but was scratched and moved back to Game 3 due to a stomach virus. Pettitte was rocked early. Bret Boone drove in Gerald Williams with a RBI double in the first. The Yankees tied the game in bottom of the inning on Paul O'Neill's RBI single, but in the third, Brian Jordan had an RBI single scoring Boone, and Jose Hernandez doubled in Jordan and Andruw Jones. In the fourth inning, Bret Boone doubled in Gerald Williams for a second time in the game to make the score 5–1. He then was called out trying to steal third. Replays appeared to show that he slid in just ahead of the tag, and this call likely cost the Braves a run, as Chipper Jones doubled two pitches later.  Glavine was sharp through seven innings but gave up homers to Tino Martinez in the fifth and Chad Curtis, trimming the Braves lead to 5–3. The Yankees bullpen was solid, holding the Braves scoreless after Pettitte left the game. In the eighth, a tiring Glavine surrendered a two-run homer to Knoblauch to tie up the game at 5–5. There had been question as to whether to leave Glavine in for that inning. He had only thrown 72 pitches, but said later that he felt like his body was tiring coming off the illness that sidelined him from his scheduled Game 1 start, and felt hesitant to go back out but said he would try for one more inning. Glavine would be replaced by John Rocker who shut out the Yankees until he was relieved after the ninth. The score remained knotted until the bottom of the tenth when Chad Curtis blasted a walk-off home run—his second home run of the game—off Mike Remlinger, giving the Yankees a commanding 3–0 lead in the Series.

Game 4

Game 4 featured the presentation of the Roberto Clemente Award to Tony Gwynn, followed by a battle of hard-throwing Cy Young Award winners, Roger Clemens and John Smoltz. In the third inning, the Yanks broke through when Tino Martinez singled off Ryan Klesko's foot with the bases loaded, driving in two runs. Jorge Posada followed with another RBI single, making the score 3–0. Clemens, seeking his first World Series victory, was outstanding, the only Braves scoring coming in the eighth when Boone singled in Walt Weiss. Jim Leyritz added another Yankees run with a shot in the eighth, adding to his legacy as a great postseason performer and as one of the thorns in the side of Braves fans. Rivera, who was named Series MVP, got Keith Lockhart to fly out to LF Curtis for the final out of the season.

The 1999 New York Yankees became the first team to win the World Series in consecutive sweeps since the 1938–1939 Yankees. It was the first sweep by a team without home-field advantage since  when Baltimore swept the Dodgers. The Yankees players were each paid $326,000 for this World Championship.

With the Yankees' sweep of the Braves, this was the second time in 1999 that a New York City team had swept a team from Atlanta out of a playoffs; the Knicks had swept the Hawks in the second round of the NBA Playoffs during their Cinderella run to the NBA Finals, where they lost to the San Antonio Spurs. It would also mark the final time the Yankees clinched the championship at the old Yankee Stadium.

The powerhouse Braves batted just .200 in the 4-game Series.

Composite box
1999 World Series (4–0): New York Yankees (A.L.) beat Atlanta Braves (N.L.).

Aftermath
In comparing the success of teams in the five major North American sports leagues, this series win brought the Yankees' World Series total to 25, putting them two titles ahead of the NHL Montreal Canadiens' 23 Stanley Cup victories for most championships (Montreal also won the Stanley Cup in 1916 as part of the National Hockey Association for a total of 24). This was the fifth World Series appearance in the 1990s for Atlanta, but the new decade would not be as favorable to them, the closest they got to returning to the World Series in the Bobby Cox era was in the 2001 NLCS where they lost to Arizona in five games (Cox stepped down as manager after the 2010 season). Atlanta would reach the NLCS again in 2020 where they fell to eventual world champion Los Angeles Dodgers in 7 games after leading the series 3-1. The Braves would get their revenge on the Dodgers the next year by beating them in 6 games. 1999 World Series was the Braves' last Fall Classic until 2021, where they won in 6 games over the Houston Astros. Game 2 also marks the second and final time that Turner Field hosted a World Series game.

The Yankees would continue their dynasty by defeating the New York Mets in the next year's World Series. They won a fourth straight pennant in 2001, but they lost to the Arizona Diamondbacks in that season's World Series. They would reach the World Series again in 2003 (losing to the Florida Marlins) and 2009 (defeating the defending champions, the Philadelphia Phillies).

On October 11, 2005, A&E Home Video released the New York Yankees Fall Classic Collectors Edition (1996–2001) DVD set. Game 3 of the 1999 World Series is included in the set.

Media coverage
This was NBC's 39th and final World Series telecast to date, as Fox aired the next World Series as part of the contract in place, and acquired the exclusive broadcast rights of Major League Baseball beginning in 2001. Bob Costas provided play-by-play while Joe Morgan served as analyst for the series. Hannah Storm served as pre-game host with Barry Larkin serving as the analyst. The field reporters were Jim Gray (Yankees dugout) and Craig Sager (Braves dugout) on loan from Turner Sports.

With the Knicks having played in the NBA Finals in June, this was the second championship series in 1999 that NBC broadcast involving teams from New York. Bob Costas, Jim Gray, and Hannah Storm were involved both times: Costas with play-by-play, Gray as a reporter, and Storm as pre-game host. This was the most recent year that a city hosted both the NBA Finals and the World Series in the same year, until Cleveland did so in 2016.

Once again, ESPN Radio provided coverage of the World Series. Play-by-play man Jon Miller was joined in the booth by Rick Sutcliffe, who substituted for the unavailable Joe Morgan.

See also 
 1999 Japan Series

References

External links 

 1999 World Series Coverage
 1999 NLCS | Game 5 

World Series
World Series
New York Yankees postseason
Atlanta Braves postseason
World Series
World Series
World Series
World Series
Sports competitions in New York City
Sports competitions in Atlanta
1990s in the Bronx